Gujjula Ravindra Reddy (born 1954) is a former member of the state parliament of Brandenburg and former mayor of Altlandsberg. He was born in Neredupalli (village), Pedacherlopalli (mandal) Kanigiri, Prakasam District, Andhra Pradesh, India.

Reddy visited areas devastated by the 2004 Indian Ocean earthquake. In four villages near Avanigadda, Andhra Pradesh tsunami shelters doubling as school buildings were constructed using charitable donations from the German Government and organisations such as Lions Club, Altlandsberg, Solidarity Service International (SODI) and Aktion Deutschland Hilft and Berlin-Lichtenberg.

External links
Dr Ravindra was felicitated by President of India, Shri Pranab Mukherjee during the World Telugu Conference in December 2012.
He was recognized as one of the top ten Telugu-speaking people making the community proud.  

 Official Website of Ravindra Gujjula

References

Mayors of places in Brandenburg
Indian emigrants to Germany
Living people
People from Prakasam district
1954 births